The 1951 USC Trojans football team represented the University of Southern California in the 1951 college football season. The Trojans finished the  season with a 7–3 record.

Schedule

Coaching staff
 Head coach: Jess Hill
 Assistant coaches: Walter Hargesheimer (backfield coach), Mel Hein (line coach), Joe Muha (backfield coach), Bill Fisk (end coach), Don Clark (line coach), Jess Mortensen (junior varsity coach), Hilton A. Green (senior manager)

Roster
HB #16 Frank Gifford, Sr.

1952 NFL Draft
The following players were drafted into professional football following the season.

References

USC
USC Trojans football seasons
USC Trojans football